Domokos is a Hungarian given name and surname that may refer to
Given name
Domokos Bölöni (born 1946), Romanian Magyar writer and journalist
Domokos Kosáry (1913–2007), Hungarian historian and writer
Domokos Szollár (born 1975), Hungarian businessman

Surname
Gábor Domokos (born 1961), Hungarian mathematician 
József Domokos (1890–1978), Hungarian jurist
László Domokos (born 1965), Hungarian politician

Hungarian-language surnames